Vegeholm Castle is located in Ängelholm Municipality in Scania,  Sweden.
The castle is a three-story stone house with a high, split roof that lies around an almost quadratic yard. In two corners there are large, square towers. On both sides of the north facade there are two free laying long buildings.

History

Vegeholm was first built in the early 16th century  and was burned in 1525. It was rebuilt again in 1530 by Danish nobleman Tyge Krabbe (1474-1541) who was Riksmarsk  and commander at Helsingborg. It was owned by his family until 1663, when it was bought by Gustaf Otto Stenbock (1614–1685) who was governor general of Skåne, Halland and Blekinge. After his death it was first possessed by Olof Nilsson Engelholm and thereafter by Johan Cedercrantz. His family owned Vegeholm until 1814 when it was thoroughly renovated. 

The manor changed owners several times in the 19th century.
In the early 20th century it was bought by Wilhelmina and Walther von Hallwyl who gave it as a gift to their daughter Irma von Geijer and her husband Wilhelm von Geijer and restored and renovated it. Vegeholm  is still owned and inhibited by members of the von Geijer family.

See also
List of castles in Sweden

References

Castles in Skåne County
 
Manor houses in Sweden